The Col de la République or Col de Grand Bois is a mountain pass in the Pilat massif within the Pilat Regional Natural Park in the Loire department of the Rhône-Alpes region in southern France. Located on the D1082 (ex-RN 82 ) in the commune of Saint-Genest-Malifaux, it connects Saint-Étienne with Annonay in the Rhône valley.  The road was constructed in 1830 and the col has an altitude of 1,161 metres.

It was the first climb on the first Tour de France in 1903, but was the scene of notorious violence in 1904 that involved fighting and officials firing gunshot warnings. It has been part of the route on 13 occasions.

History

The name 'La République' and that of the nearby hamlet of 'La République' derive from the attempt by members of the Beguine religious sect to found an independent community there called the Republic of Jesus Christ. The Beguines were well established in Saint-Jean-Bonnefonds, but in November 1794 they moved 20 kilometres to the plateau to be ready for the arrival of the prophet Elijah.

Cycling

Details of the climb
From  Saint-Étienne (north), the climb is 17 km long. Over this distance, it gains 644 m at an average of 3.8%. The maximum gradient is 6.3%.

From the south, the climb starts at Bourg-Argental; from here, the ascent is 12 km long, climbing 626 m at an average of 5.2%, with a maximum of 7.9%.

Vélocio
 
At the top is a monument in memory of Paul de Vivie, who wrote under the pseudonym Vélocio and was important in the development of bicycle touring. The col de la République was his favourite morning ride.  Every year since 1922 the volunteers of the 'Comité Vélocio de Saint-Étienne' have organized the Journée Vélocio (Vélocio Day-Trip), a 12.788 km climb of the col.

Tour de France
The col de la République was the first pass of over 1,000 metres crossed by the Tour de France, in 1903 during the second stage of the first Tour de France (Lyons - Marseilles via Saint-Étienne) when Hippolyte Aucouturier was the first rider to reach the summit.

The following year, in the 1904 Tour de France, it was the scene of some of the most notorious violence in the history of the tour when supporters of the regional favourite Antoine Fauré attacked his opponents. This caused the organizers to avoid the Loire department until the 1950 Tour de France.  In 1905, the tour's organiser Henri Desgrange chose to ignore the col de la République, and focused instead on the introduction of the  Ballon d'Alsace, because he saw that he had missed the opportunity of publicity previously.

In the 1904 incident, Andre Fauré led the race and 200 fans tried to stop the rest of the cyclists from following him. Garin hurt his hand during the incident, and Giovanni Gerbi had to give up with broken fingers. The situation was only solved after race officials fired shots in the air. Further on, nails and broken glass had been spread along the road, which caused many flat tires. Because of this help, Fauré was the first on top of the col, but was over-taken by the favourites later.

At the summit a sign post says
Col de la République
1er col à plus de 1000 mètres franchi par le tour de France cycliste le 5 juillet 1903
(The 1st col higher than 1,000 metres traversed by the cycling Tour de France on 5 July 1903)

Appearances
The col has been used 13 times in the Tour de France, and the first rider to cross the summit on each occasion was:

See also
 List of highest paved roads in Europe
 List of mountain passes

References

External links
 
Details of the climb
Col de la République on Google Maps (Tour de France classic climbs)

Landforms of Auvergne-Rhône-Alpes
Landforms of Loire (department)
Mountain passes of Auvergne-Rhône-Alpes
Mountain passes of the Massif Central